Litchfield Senior High is a public high school in Litchfield, Minnesota, United States.  Established in 1880.  The official school colors are Green, Black, and White, with the mascot of the Dragons. The student body consists of approximately 548, with a total of about 1,700 students for District 465. This allows for an average of a 15:1 student ratio.

Sports
Baseball (Boys)
Basketball (Boys/Girls)
Cross Country (Boys/Girls)
Dance Team (Girls)
Football (Boys)
Golf (Boys/Girls)
Gymnastics (Girls)
Ice Hockey (Boys/Girls)
Softball (Girls)
Tennis (Boys/Girls)
Track and Field (Boys/Girls)
Wrestling (Boys)
Swimming/Diving (Boys/Girls)
Volleyball (Girls)

Notable Litchfield Senior High Alumni
John Carlson – Former NFL Tight End. Over his 6 year career, he played for the Seattle Seahawks(2008-2010), the Minnesota Vikings(2012-2013), and the Arizona Cardinals(2014).
Cassandra Jopp –Karaoke World Champion 2011.

References

External links

Litchfield Public Schools

Schools in Meeker County, Minnesota
Public high schools in Minnesota
Educational institutions established in 1880
1880 establishments in Minnesota